Outer space comprises the relatively empty regions of the universe outside the atmospheres of celestial bodies.

Outer space may also refer to:

Music

 OuterSpace, a hip hop duo from Philadelphia
 Outerspace (album), a 2004 compilation by OuterSpace
 Outer Space (EP), a 2009 EP by S-Endz
 The Outerspace, a 1995 EP by Transwave
 "Outer Space", a 1997 song by the Muffs from Happy Birthday to Me
 "Cosmos (Outer Space)", a 2005 song by t.A.T.u. from Dangerous and Moving

Other uses

 Outer space (color), a shade of black
 Outer space (mathematics), a topological space
 Outer Space (video game), a 1978 video game

See also 
 Outer Space Treaty, a 1967 treaty on international space law
 United Nations Office for Outer Space Affairs, a part of the UN Secretariat
 Inner space (disambiguation)
 Space (disambiguation),  for the conceptual (abstract) sense of the word